Sarah Lockwood Winchester (née Pardee; 1839 – September 5, 1922) was an American heiress who amassed great wealth after the death of her husband, William Wirt Winchester, and her mother in law, Jane Ellen Hope. Her inheritance included $20 million ($ million in ) as well as a 50% holding in the Winchester Repeating Arms Company, which made her one of the wealthiest women in the world at the time.

Sarah Winchester is best known for using her vast fortune to continue construction on the Winchester mansion in San Jose, California, for 22 years. Popular legends, which began during her lifetime, held that she was convinced she was cursed by the spirits of those killed by the Winchester rifle, and the only way to protect herself was to continually add on to her California home. This legend was further exaggerated by John and Mayme Brown, theme park developers, who bought the property with the intention of turning it into an attraction. Sarah, however, wasn't obsessed with building due to fear of being haunted; in fact, most of the anomalies in the house were due to quick repairs made after the 1906 earthquake destroyed much of the house.

Since her death, the sprawling Winchester Mystery House has become a popular tourist attraction, known for its staircases that lead to nowhere, along with its many winding corridors and doors that lead to walls or sudden drops.

Early life
She was born the daughter of Leonard Pardee and his wife Sarah W. (née Burns), in Summer 1839 in New Haven, Connecticut. On September 30, 1862, in New Haven, Sarah married William Wirt Winchester, the only son of Oliver Winchester, the owner of the Winchester Repeating Arms Company. Sarah and William had one daughter, Annie Pardee Winchester, who was born on June 15, 1866 and died on July 25, 1866 of marasmus.

In the span of one year, 1881, she lost her mother, her father-in-law, and finally her husband William, who died of tuberculosis.

In 1886, she purchased a small, two-story farmhouse and ranch in San Jose, California. The property was called Llanada Villa, and would later become known as the Winchester Mystery House.

Other properties 

In 1888 Winchester purchased 140 acres of land, the majority of what is now downtown Los Altos, California, to use as a ranch. She also purchased a farmhouse, now known as the Winchester-Merriman House, for her sister and brother-in-law. The house is listed on the Historic Resources Inventory of the Los Altos Historical Commission.

In the 1920s Mrs Winchester also maintained a houseboat on San Francisco Bay at Burlingame, California, which became known as "Sarah's Ark", as it was reputedly kept there as insurance against her fear of a second great flood, such as the Biblical one experienced by Noah and his family, but a more mundane answer is that many people of her social standing in California at that time had houseboats or yachts. The "Ark" was located near the eucalyptus grove at Winchester Road, south of what was to become the intersection of Anza Boulevard and U.S. Highway 101. The ark was destroyed by fire in 1929.

Death
She died at Llanada Villa on September 5, 1922, at 10:45pm of heart failure. A service was held in Palo Alto, California, and her remains lay at Alta Mesa Cemetery until they were transferred, along with those of her sister, to New Haven, Connecticut. She was buried next to Sarah's husband and an infant child in Evergreen Cemetery. She left a will written in thirteen sections, which she signed thirteen times. The belongings in Winchester Mystery House were left to her niece, Marian I. Marriott, who auctioned off almost everything.

Following her death, the home was auctioned to the highest bidder, who then turned it into an attraction for the public; the first tourists walked through the house in February 1923, five months after Winchester died.

Legacy
The Santa Clara-Los Gatos Boulevard in front of the house was later renamed Winchester Boulevard, after the house. Today, the house is open to the public every day except Christmas Day. Tours are conducted of both the house and the grounds on those days.
The Haunting of Winchester is a musical about her by Craig Bohmler and Mary Bracken Phillips that takes place in the Winchester Mystery House. It was commissioned by the San Jose Repertory Theatre for its 25th anniversary season, and premiered in September–October 2005.
In 2016, French director Bertrand Bonello's short film Sarah Winchester, opéra fantôme received an exclusive global online premiere on Mubi.
She was portrayed by actress Helen Mirren in the 2018 horror film Winchester.
The American poet Alexandra Teague's book, The Wise and Foolish Builders (Persea, 2015), reconsiders Sarah Winchester's legacy in the context of Westward expansion and gun violence.
The podcast Criminal covered Sarah Winchester's endless building of the Winchester mansion on their episode "The Widow and the Winchester."

Footnotes

Sources
New York Times; June 12, 1911, Monday; Winchester's Widow Dying. 
New York Times; May 31, 1970, Sunday; San Jose, California. "A stairway that leads nowhere, a window that opens to reveal only a wall, a doorway that leads to nothing. These are parts of a disjointed, 160-room Victorian mansion that Mrs. Sarah Winchester built on the northern outskirts of San Jose after the sudden loss of both her husband, the son of Oliver Fisher Winchester, the rifle magnate, and her daughter. After her daughter's death Sarah Winchester never tried to have kids again. Also after the death of her husband William Winchester, Sarah never married again."

External links
 Official website of Winchester Mystery House
 The Truth About Sarah Winchester
 Findagrave.com entry for Sarah Winchester

1839 births
1922 deaths
1906 San Francisco earthquake survivors
19th-century American people
20th-century American people
19th-century American women
20th-century American women
American occultists
People from New Haven, Connecticut
People from San Jose, California
Burials in Connecticut
Winchester Repeating Arms Company
People from Atherton, California